Lucid Intervals and Moments of Clarity is the fourth studio album by American heavy metal musician Michael Angelo Batio. A collaboration with drummer Rob Ross, it was produced by Batio and released on August 1, 2000 through Perris Records. Seven of the nine tracks (all but "Enough Is Enough" and "Who Can You Trust?") were later remixed and remastered for the 2004 compilation album Lucid Intervals and Moments of Clarity Part 2.

Style and reception
A review for Guitar Nine Records describes Lucid Intervals and Moments of Clarity as featuring "memorable verse and chorus melodies highlighted with intense and uncompromising solo sections", identifying "Stop Complaining" and "Take a Look Around" as particular highlights of the album.

Track listing

Personnel

Primary musicians
Michael Angelo Batio – guitars, bass, keyboards, vocals on track 4, arrangement on track 9, production, engineering, mixing
Rob Ross – drums, percussion, vocals on track 9, production assistance

Additional personnel
William Kopecky – bass on tracks 1, 3, 8 and 9
Mark Richardson – mastering
Dan Machnik – photography

References

Michael Angelo Batio albums
2000 albums
M.A.C.E. Music albums